Xenormicola is a genus of moths of the family Notodontidae. It consists of the following species:
Xenormicola extensa (Hering, 1925)
Xenormicola prouti  Hering, 1928

Notodontidae of South America